Groutite is a manganese oxide mineral with formula Mn3+O(OH). It is a member of the diaspore group and is trimorphous with manganite and feitknechtite. It forms lustrous black crystals in the orthorhombic system.

It occurs in weathered banded iron formations, metamorphosed manganese ore bodies and hydrothermal ore environments.
It was first described in 1945 for an occurrence in the Mahnomen mine, Cuyuna Range, Crow Wing County, Minnesota and named for petrologist Frank Fitch Grout (1880–1958), of the University of Minnesota.

References

Manganese(III) minerals
Orthorhombic minerals
Minerals in space group 62